Christopher Thomas Russell (born 1943 in St. Albans, England) is head of the Space Physics Center at the Institute of Geophysics and Planetary Physics (IGPP) at UCLA, professor in UCLA's Department of Earth, Planetary, and Space Sciences, and Director of the UCLA Branch of the California Space Grant Consortium.  He received a B.Sc. from the University of Toronto in 1964 and a Ph.D. from UCLA in 1968.  In 1977 he was awarded the James B. Macelwane Medal and in 2003 the John Adam Fleming Medal by the American Geophysical Union (AGU).  He is also a Fellow of the AGU. Asteroid 21459 Chrisrussell was named after him in 2008. In 2017, he was awarded the NASA Distinguished Public Service Medal.  He has three grandchildren.

Research
 He led the Magnetic Fields Experiments on NASA's Polar satellite to map the earth's magnetosphere.
 He led NASA's Dawn Mission team.  Dawn orbited Vesta in 2011 and 2012 and entered the orbit of Ceres in 2015.  It was the first spacecraft to orbit two celestial bodies.
 In collaboration with John L. Philips he has studied the ashen light on Venus.
 He has studied the solar wind through his participation in NASA's STEREO and the European Space Agency's Venus Express missions.

Selected publications

References

External links
.

Living people
1943 births
University of California, Los Angeles faculty
University of California, Los Angeles alumni
UCLA Department of Earth Planetary and Space Sciences alumni
Fellows of the American Geophysical Union